Limnichoderus ovatus is a species of beetle in Limnichidae, a family with the vernacular name "minute marsh-loving beetles". 

As the name suggests, Limnichoderus ovatus tends to be found in or near marsh biomes. It is found in Central and North America, primarily in the Southern United States and Mexico.

References

Further reading

 
 
 
 
 
 
 
 
 
 

Byrrhoidea